The 1968 Casiguran earthquake occurred on  with a moment magnitude of 7.6 and a maximum Mercalli intensity of IX (Violent). The thrust earthquake's epicenter was in Casiguran, Quezon (now part of Aurora province). A small non-destructive tsunami was generated and at least 207 people were killed. The majority of the deaths occurred in the collapse of a six-story building in Manila.

Damage
In Manila, many structures that suffered severe damage had been built near the mouth of the Pasig River on huge alluvial deposits. A number of buildings were damaged beyond repair while others only suffered cosmetic damage. 268 people were reported to have died during the collapse of the six-story Ruby Tower, located at the corner of Doroteo Jose and Teodora Alonzo Streets in the district of Santa Cruz. The entire building, save for a portion of the first and second floors at its northern end, was destroyed. Allegations of poor design and construction, as well as the use of poor-quality building materials arose. In the district of Santa Ana, one person was injured by debris from a damaged apartment building.
Two more people from Aurora sub province and Pampanga died as a direct result of the quake. Around the town of Casiguran, there were several reports of landslides, the most destructive one at Casiguran Bay.

Aftershocks
The aftershock sequence throughout the month of August included many moderate shocks, including fifteen over 5.0 . The strongest of these occurred on August 3 with a 5.9  event that produced intensities of III–IV in Manila.

Aftermath and legacy
The former location of Ruby Tower in Santa Cruz district is now a memorial hall which stands today.

See also
1990 Luzon earthquake
2022 Luzon earthquake
List of earthquakes in 1968
List of earthquakes in the Philippines

Notes

References

Sources

External links
Casiguran Earthquake - 02 August 1968 – Philippine Institute of Volcanology and Seismology
M7.6 - Luzon, Philippines – United States Geological Survey

1968 Casiguran Earthquake
Casiguran earthquake
Casiguran Earthquake
History of Aurora (province)
History of Manila